The 1918 Cincinnati Reds season was a season in American baseball. The team finished third in the National League with a record of 68–60, 15½ games behind the Chicago Cubs.

Off-season 
In March, the Reds sold third baseman Bill McKechnie to the Pittsburgh Pirates for $20,000.  McKechnie had previously played for the Pirates from 1907-1912.  A natural third baseman, he appeared in only four games at third for the Reds in 1917, as he played most of his games at second base.

On March 18, Cincinnati was part of a three way deal with the St. Louis Browns and New York Yankees.  In the deal, the Reds received Lee Magee from the Browns.  Magee would become the Reds starting second baseman, and split the 1917 season with the Browns and Yankees.  In 87 games between the two clubs, Magee hit .200 with no home runs and 12 RBI.  The Reds sent catcher Tommy Clarke to New York to complete the deal.

A couple of weeks later, on April 1, the Reds sent second baseman Dave Shean to the Boston Red Sox for pitcher Rube Foster.  Foster refused to report in Cincinnati and the Red Sox sent the Reds cash to complete the trade.

Regular season 
Midway through the season, Reds first baseman Hal Chase allegedly paid pitcher Jimmy Ring $50 to throw a game against the New York Giants.  Manager Christy Mathewson got wind of it and suspended Chase for the remainder of the season, and brought formal charges against Chase for fixing games, but National League president John Heydler acquitted him.  Heydler had told sportswriter Fred Lieb in private that he believed Chase had bet on baseball, but did not have enough evidence to convict him.

On July 15, the Reds sold pitcher Fred Toney to the New York Giants.  Toney, who had pitched with the club since 1915, was only 6-10 with a 2.90 ERA and had lost his spot in the Reds starting rotation due to the emergence of Jimmy Ring and Hod Eller.

Late in the season, with only 10 games remaining, manager Christy Mathewson left the Reds to enlist in the United States Army for World War I.  He served overseas in the newly formed Chemical Service with Ty Cobb.  Third baseman Heinie Groh took over as manager for the remainder of the season.

Season summary 
After a good 1917 season in which the team finished over .500 for the first time since 1909, the Reds hoped to build off of that success in 1918.  Over the first 35 games of the season, Cincinnati had a very respectable 20-15 record, and was in third place in the National League, five games behind the first place New York Giants.  The Reds then struggled badly over the next 29 games, winning only five of them to drop completely out of the pennant race.  Only July 4, the Reds had a 25-39 record, and sat in seventh place, 21 games out of first.

The team would play very good baseball over the final months and turned their season around.  Over their final 64 games, the Reds had a 43-21 record, and finished the season, which was cut short due to World War I, with a 68-60 record, which put them in third place, 15.5 games behind the pennant winning Chicago Cubs.  The Reds .531 winning percentage was their highest since 1904.

Outfielder Edd Roush had another superb season, as he led the club with a .333 batting average, five home runs, 62 RBI and 24 stolen bases in 113 games.  Third baseman Heinie Groh batted .320 with one home run and 37 RBI.  First baseman Hal Chase batted .301 with two home runs and 38 RBI in 74 games before being suspended for the season by manager Christy Mathewson.  Outfielder Sherry Magee took over at first base for Chase, and he led the club with 76 RBI, while batting .298 with two home runs in 115 games.

Pitcher Hod Eller led the Reds pitching staff with a 16-12 record, 2.36 ERA and led the team in innings pitched with 217.2  Pete Schneider struggled with a 10-15 record and a 3.53 ERA, however, he led the Reds with 17 complete games.  Jimmy Ring had a solid season, going 9-5 with a 2.85 ERA in 21 games, while Rube Bressler went 8-5 with a 2.46 ERA in 17 games.

Season standings

Record vs. opponents

Roster

Player stats

Batting

Starters by position 
Note: Pos = Position; G = Games played; AB = At bats; H = Hits; Avg. = Batting average; HR = Home runs; RBI = Runs batted in

Other batters 
Note: G = Games played; AB = At bats; H = Hits; Avg. = Batting average; HR = Home runs; RBI = Runs batted in

Pitching

Starting pitchers 
Note: G = Games pitched; IP = Innings pitched; W = Wins; L = Losses; ERA = Earned run average; SO = Strikeouts

Other pitchers 
Note: G = Games pitched; IP = Innings pitched; W = Wins; L = Losses; ERA = Earned run average; SO = Strikeouts

Relief pitchers 
Note: G = Games pitched; W = Wins; L = Losses; SV = Saves; ERA = Earned run average; SO = Strikeouts

References 
1918 Cincinnati Reds season at Baseball Reference

Cincinnati Reds seasons
Cincinnati Reds season
Cincinnati Reds